Ercan Özçelik (Ercan Oezcelik) (born 12 August 1966 in Ordu, Turkey) is a German actor with Turkish roots.

Biography 
Özçelik has worked with Hal Hartley (director), Jeff Goldblum, Parker Posey, Oliver Berben, Iris Berben, Ilja Richter, Michael Degen, Michael Karen, Demir Gökgöl and with many other great artists.
He is working in German and international films - especially in comedies and dramas with black humor.
Since 30 years he has been involved as an actor in German theaters of state, and in numerous international film & TV productions. For example; in the international movie FAY GRIM he played the detective-role (directed by Hal Hartley, with Jeff Goldblum, Parker Posey, etc.). Further the main role in THE DISAPPEARANCE (directed by Roger Deutsch/Gabor Holtai), and the main role of a chief commissioner in the famous ARD-TATORT series, as well as the lead role of a neurologist and surgeon in the RTL series DR. BRUCKNER.

His acting techniques are: a mix of Lee Strasberg („method“) and Dominique De Fazio („poetic theater“).

Filmography (selected)

Films 
 1996: 5 Minuten Ikarus (SFB/Boomtown), director: Martin Eigler
 1997: SADUJ (SFB/Boomtown), director: Martin Eigler
 1997: Die Pointe (TwilightFilms), director: Jürgen Weber
 2004: Illusion X, director: Martin Morlock
 2004: Folge der Feder (moneypenny filmproduction), director: Nuray Sahin
 2006: Fay Grim (ZeroFilm/Possiblefilms), director Hal Hartley
 2008: Fünf Fische, zwei Brote, director: Alex Eslam
 2009:  (SamFilm), director: Rainer Matsutani
 2016: The Disappearance / In The Same Garden (Ottofilms), director: Roger Deutsch, Gabor Holtai

Television 
 1990: Pfarrerin Lenau (SDR)
 1993: Motzki (ARD), director: Thomas Nennstiel
 1995: 1/2 Minuten (Studio Hamburg, ZDF), director: Rolf Schübel
 1997: Reise in die Nacht (Eikon Media, ZDF), director: Matti Geschonneck
 1998-1996: OP ruft Dr. Bruckner (Phoenix Film, RTL), director: Bielawa, Weber, Siebenmann, Bohn, u.a.
 1999: Off Road (Berengar Pfahl Film, ARD), director: Michael Zenz
 1999: Die Straßen von Berlin (Nova Film, ProSieben), director: Werner Masten
 2000: Ein Vater im Alleingang (Calypso Film, Sat.1), director: Diethard Küster
 2000-1999: Drehkreuz Airport (Nova Film, ZDF), director: Werner Masten
 2001:  (Moovie Entertainment, Sat.1), director: Oliver Berben
 2001-2000: Die Pfefferkörner (Studio Hamburg, NDR), director: Matthias Steurer
 2003-2001: Tatort (Maran Film, ARD), director: Oetzmann, Huber
 2003: Eva Blond, director: Hermine Huntgeburth
 2006:  (Rat Pack Film, ProSieben), director: 
 2007: Da kommt Kalle (Network Movie, ZDF), director: Lars Jessen
 2007: Leipzig Homicide (UFA Film, ZDF), director: Oren Schmuckler
 2008: GSG 9 – Ihr Einsatz ist ihr Leben (Typhoon Film, Sat.1), director: H.-G. Bücking
 2009: Märchenstunde - 1001 Nacht (Rat Pack Film, ProSieben), director: Michael Karen
 2011: Molly & Mops (Mungofilm, ZDF/ORF), director: Michael Karen

Theater (selected) 
 1986 Zirkus, Die Insel/Badisches Staatstheater Karlsruhe, director: Kiumars Sharif
 1986 Die Physiker, Die Insel/Badisches Staatstheater Karlsruhe, director: Kiumars Sharif
 1987 Unsere kleine Stadt, Gengenbacher Freilichtspiele, director: Michael & Werner Wedekind
 1988-89 Der Vogelkopp, Das Leben der Hilletje Jans, Blutsbrüder/Kinder- u. Jugendtheater Landesbühne Bruchsal, director: Parchwitz, Benkelmann, Printschitsch
 1988 Bitterer Honig, Die Insel/Badisches Staatstheater Karlsruhe, director: Rolphe de la Croix (Schüler von Gustaf Gründgens)
 1989–1990 Arturo Ui am Bremer Schauspielhaus, director: Andras Fricsay
 1990 Geheime Freunde, Schillertheater Berlin, director: Airan Berg
 1994 Katzelmacher am Nationaltheater Mannheim, director: Michael Wittenberg
 1995 Dreigroschenlieder, Independent Productions, director: Selçuk Sazak
 2004 Im Rausch der Tiefe, Independent Production, director: Ercan Oezcelik/Peter Bleckwehl

Awards 
For Die Pfefferkörner:
 2001 Asia Pacific Broadcasting Union – The ABU Prize for Children's Programmes Television
 2000 Golden Telix, in the Category: best Serial

For Folge der Feder!:
 2004 International Filmfestival Mannheim-Heidelberg, Audience Award
 2005 Ankara International Filmfestival, Best Director / Screenplay
 2005 German Television Award, Best Cinematography

For Kiss me Kismet:
 Filmfestival Television in Baden-Baden, Prize of Jury; main Prize of the German Academy of Performing Arts; Audience Award by 3.sat
 2007 Nomin. German Television Award
 2007 Adolf-Grimme-Prize

External links 
 
 Ercan Oezcelik on his representation
 Ercan Oezcelik on Castupload Simone Bär
 Ercan Oezcelik on Castforward in Germany

1966 births
German people of Turkish descent
German male television actors
German male film actors
German male stage actors
Turkish male television actors
Turkish male film actors
Turkish male stage actors
Living people